John Crickmere {1822- Oxford 20 September 1846} was an English steeplechase jockey who took part in the Grand National steeplechase four times during the 1840s, finishing in the first four on each occasion and winning the race on Discount (racehorse) in 1844. In 1846 he developed Consumption from which he died before the end of that year aged just twenty-four.

English jockeys
19th-century English people